Christina Lagerwall (born 8 April 1939) is a Swedish fencer. She competed in the women's individual foil event at the 1960 Summer Olympics.

References

External links
 

1939 births
Living people
Swedish male foil fencers
Olympic fencers of Sweden
Fencers at the 1960 Summer Olympics
Sportspeople from Gothenburg
20th-century Swedish people